Robert Barkhimer (March 2, 1916 – June 17, 2006), nicknamed "Barky", was a promoter on the West Coast of the United States. He was born in Berkeley, California. His career started as a midget car racer and ended as a senior vice president at NASCAR.

Racing career
Barkhimer was a 21-year-old newlywed when he went with his wife to car races at Emeryville, California. It was his first time attending midget car races, and the third time he attended a racing event. He was puzzled what circus midgets had to do with racing. He was hooked and he wanted to race a midget racecar. He was unable to obtain a car. He found a racecar owner named Delucci who was not paid for a car he had sold. Barkhimer could run the midget car if he would repossess the car. Barkhimer located the car dismantled in boxes. Barkhimer loaded up the car and took it the car home. Barkhimer was not a mechanic, but he found a local racer named Jimmy Aiten to help assemble the midget car if Aiten could drive it. That Tuesday night Aiten raced the car at Neptune Beach Speedway. The car ran well in the heat race for two laps before it slowed. The same thing happened in the semi-feature. They determined that they were using the wrong spark plugs. At the races the following week, the engine threw a connecting rod out of the side of the engine block, wrecking the engine. They gave the car back to Delucci.

Barkhimer and Aiten purchased a midget car. After Aiten raced the car one night, he accepted an offer to race a different car on the day of the second race. Barkhimer was forced to race his racecar even though he had never raced before. He borrowed a football helmet and sat in the car on the inside front row. He quickly fell from the first starting position to last place. His racing skills developed to the point that he became the Bay City Racing Association (BCRA) champion in 1945. He won six events that season. He won ten events in 1946, and four in 1947 before he got injured.

Promoter
In 1948 Barkhimer quit racing to become the Business Manager for BCRA. In 1949 Barkhimer took over San Jose Speedway. San Jose was losing fans. Barkhimer saw that midgets were losing their appeal, so he ended the midget class in favor of a hardtop late model stock car division. They were a hit and the crowds returned. Also in 1949, Barkhimer and Jerry Piper started their own association called California Stock Car Racing Association (CSCRA). He eventually promoted 21 or 22 racetracks on the West Coast.

In 1954 Bill France Jr., son of NASCAR found Bill France, Sr., was stationed on the West Coast while serving in the United States Navy. He was stationed at the northern California Navy Air Base known as Moffett Field. The elder France had his son talk with Barkhimer. Barkhimer, his partner Margo Burke, and the younger France went to races together and hung out on weekends. The friendship led to Barkhimer going to Daytona Beach, Florida to meet with the elder France and to watch a race at the Daytona Beach Road Course. France and Barkhimer discussed uniform rules and guaranteed payout for drivers. That meeting resulted in ten of Barkhimer's tracks becoming NASCAR sanctioned. The first track was Stockton 99, and tracks in Oakland, Fresno, San Jose and Hughes Stadium in Sacramento soon followed.

Barkhimer became a Senior Vice President in NASCAR. During his career, he had also promoted boxing, car shows, roller derbies, and wrestling. He retired after his first wife died in 1976. He had promoted 3000 races in his career. Barkhimer and Burke sold out to Ken Clapp. After retiring, he traveled and wrote stories about the early years of racing.

Personal life
He married the former Mary Cecil Slattery of Alameda in 1936. After she died, he married Jean Hightower in 1980. She died in 2005. Barkhimer had a son, Bill, and three daughters, Shirley, Bonnie, and Judy.

Awards
He was inducted in the West Coast Stock Car Hall of Fame in its first class in 2002.

References

NASCAR people
1916 births
2006 deaths
Sportspeople from Berkeley, California